Labpur Assembly constituency is an assembly constituency in Birbhum district in the Indian state of West Bengal.

Overview
As per orders of the Delimitation Commission, No. 288 Labpur Assembly constituency is composed of the following: Labpur CD Block and Ahmedpur, Amarpur, Bhromorkol, Panrui, Sangra and Shrinidhipur gram panchayats of Sainthia CD Block.

Labpur Assembly constituency is part of No. 41 Bolpur (Lok Sabha constituency) (SC).

Election results

2021
In the 2021 elections, Abhijit Sinha(Rana) of Trinamool Congress defeated his nearest rival Biswajit Mondal of BJP.

2016
In the 2016 elections, Manirul Islam of Trinamool Congress defeated his nearest rival Syed mahfu Karim of CPI(M).

2011
In the 2011 elections, Manirul Islam of Trinamool Congress defeated his nearest rival Nabanita Mukherjee of CPI(M).

 

.# Swing calculated on Congress+Trinamool Congress vote percentages taken together in 2006.

1977–2006
In the 2006 and 2001 state assembly elections Nabanita Mukherjee of CPI(M) won the Labpur assembly seat defeating Debasish Ojha of Trinamool Congress in 2006 and Arup Kumar Mishra of Trinamool Congress in 2001. Contests in most years were multi cornered but only winners and runners are being mentioned. Manik Chandra Mondal of CPI(M) defeated Deb Ranjan Mukhopadhyay of Congress in 1996 and Eunus Mallick of Congress in 1991. Sunil Kumar Mazumdar of CPI(M) defeated Eunus Mallick of Congress in 1987, Sisir Dutta of Congress in 1982, and Eunus Mallick of Congress in 1977.

1957–1972
Nirmal Kumar Sinha of CPI won in 1972. Sunil Kumar Mazumdar of CPI won in 1971. Radhanath Chattoraj of CPI(M) won in 1969. S. Bandopadhyay of Congress won in 1967.  Radhanath Chattoraj representing CPI won in 1962 and 1957. Prior to that the seat was not there.

References

Assembly constituencies of West Bengal
Politics of Birbhum district